ArchiCamp (also known as Studio in the sticks) is a grassroots architecture festival and a gathering of Australian and international architects, architecture students, craftsmen and artists, focused on sustainable architecture, ethical development, professional culture and community building. It introduced a new, interactive approach to the architectural education and practice. 

In design workshops, participants of each camp work on specific projects that directly benefit the hosting community, e.g. community halls, housing, tourism facilities, masterplans. Following the camp, students continue working on their design concepts with the communities through planning approvals and construction. 

The location of the camps changes. The events have had between 20 and 100 participants and typically run over 3–4 days. 

The events occur spontaneously without sponsors or funding. Participants sometimes contribute small amount towards common costs such as meals and leftover money is donated to charity.

Notable figures involved with the past events include Richard Leplastrier, Lindsay Johnston, Kerry and Lindsay Clare, Drew Heath, Adrian Welke, Elizabeth Farrelly.

History 
ArchiCamp was founded in 2014 by architect Jiri Lev as a grassroots event.

The inaugural ArchiCamp took place in 2014 in Mudgee, New South Wales.

In 2015, ArchiCamp assisted flood recovery in the regional town of Dungog, NSW.

References

External links
 ArchiCamp website

Architecture organisations based in Australia
Architectural education
Sustainable architecture
Architecture festivals